Jeet is an Indian Bengali film actor, producer and television presenter. He made his film debut with a Telugu film, named Chandu that was released in 2001 which did not do that well at the box office. Further, Jeet moved on to do Bengali films and had his first breakthrough by portraying the lead character in Sathi He has become one of the biggest stars Bengali cinema through the years, with films like -  Awara, Boss: Born to Rule, Bachchan, Boss 2: Back to Rule, Game: he plays to win, Badsha – The Don, Inspector Nottyk, Jor, Beshi Korechi Prem Korechi, Fighter, Dui Prithibi,Sultan: The Saviour,  Deewana,Raavan (2022 film) to his credit, all of them being All Blockbuster Hit.

From 2014 to 2020, he has starred in many films, including the critically and commercially successful venture, the psychological thriller- The Royal Bengal Tiger, Boss 2 : Back To Rule and Shesh Theke Shuru,Raavan, Besh Korechi Prem Korechi, Badsha – The Don, 

In 2022, he starred Raavan, a film made under his production house, Jeetz Filmworks.   It was released on Eid al-Fitr. He is currently working with the director Rajesh Ganguly for his upcoming film titled Chengiz, an action thriller.

As actor

As producer
His film production company is known by the banner Jeetz Filmworks/Grassroot Entertainment.

As singer

Hindi music albums

Television

Other

References

External links
 Filmography of Jeet on IMDb

Indian filmographies
Male actor filmographies